Richard Edwin Dolby, OBE, HonDMet, FREng, FIMMM, HonFWeldI (born 7 July 1938 in Sheffield) is a metallurgist and former Director of Research and Technology at The Welding Institute (TWI) in Cambridge, UK. He is a past President at the Institute of Materials, Minerals and Mining and a current Distinguished Research Fellow at the University of Cambridge Department of Materials Science and Metallurgy.

Education 

Richard Dolby was educated at Northampton Grammar School and, following two years' National Service in the Royal Electrical and Mechanical Engineers, at the University of Cambridge (Selwyn College), Department of Materials Science and Metallurgy where he also gained his PhD.

Career 

Richard Dolby's early career began at British Alcan and the General Electric Company, and in 1964 he joined The Welding Institute (British Welding Research Association). Here he worked on metallurgical aspects of HAZ toughness of pressure vessel steels and jointly led pioneering studies into lamellar tearing in welded structural steel. He spent 14 years specialising in metallurgy and carrying out fundamental industrial research in the Materials Department at the Institute, becoming Head of Department in 1978. He was appointed Director, Research and Technology in 1985 until his retirement in 2003 when The Welding Institute hosted a two-day conference in his honour.

The Welding Institute's Richard Dolby-Rolls-Royce Prize is given biennially to young engineers who demonstrate success in, and enthusiasm for, welding, joining and/or materials engineering at an early stage in their career.

Advisory committees and awards 

Richard Dolby has held appointments on the UK Technical Advisory Board on the Structural Integrity of High Integrity Plant (TAGSI), the Materials Board of the UK Defence Scientific Advisory Council and various Department of Trade and Industry Committees, as well as the Institute of Materials, Minerals and Mining (IoM3). He was President of the Institute of Materials Minerals and Mining from 2006-2007 and is a past Vice-President of the International Institute of Welding (IIW) where he also served as Chairman of the IIW Technical Management Board and Chairman of the IIW Research Strategy Group.

He was elected a Fellow of the Royal Academy of Engineering in 1987 and awarded the Order of the British Empire in 2000 for his services to research and technology transfer in materials joining. He is a past winner of The Welding Institute's Brooker Award and the Institute of Materials, Minerals and Mining's Bessemer Gold Medal for contributions to the steel industry. He was invited to deliver the Hatfield Memorial Lecture in 1997 and awarded an Honorary Doctorate of Metallurgy at the University of Sheffield in 1998. In 2003 he was presented with the IIW Arata Prize for his contribution to the science of welding and joining.

References

External links 
 R.E. Dolby selected publications and citations
 Conference announcement: Metals Joining Technology - Where Next?
 Richard Dolby-Rolls-Royce Prize, The Welding Institute

1938 births
Living people
Alumni of Selwyn College, Cambridge
Officers of the Order of the British Empire
Fellows of the Royal Academy of Engineering
Bessemer Gold Medal
British metallurgists
Fellows of the Institute of Materials, Minerals and Mining